Gilshochill is located to the north west of Maryhill in the City of Glasgow, Scotland. Immediately north of Maryhill basin and Maryhill locks, it is the district where the Bowling and Port Dundas branches of the Forth and Clyde Canal meet each other, at Stockingfield Junction. Situated on a hill overlooking Glasgow, its highest point sits at an elevation of about 150 metres above sea level. Gilshochill is spread over the area around Sandbank Street, bordering the areas of Cadder and Summerston. It falls under the G20 area postal code. It is served by Gilshochill railway station. A new footbridge connecting the area with Ruchill and providing a better link to Maryhill, was installed at Stockingfield Junction in 2022.

Gilshochill comprises semi-detached privately owned homes set in private housing estates overlooking Glasgow, some Victorian, 16th- and 17th-century buildings. There are also several towers, such as the 20-storey high rise tower blocks at Glenavon road and some tenements.

Gilshochill is set in one of the oldest areas in Maryhill; one of the oldest churches in the area is found here, dating from the late 17th century. Some houses built around the same time can also be found there.

There are also a very large number of council dwellings in this area. Some are scheduled for demolition in the future.

See also 
Forth to Firth Canal Pathway
Glasgow tower blocks

References

External links
Gilshochill at Gazetteer for Scotland

Areas of Glasgow
Maryhill